Romania competed at the 2004 Summer Olympics in Athens, Greece, from 13 to 29 August 2004. Romanian athletes have competed at every Summer Olympic Games since its official debut in 1924, missing only two editions, including the 1948 Summer Olympics. The Romanian Olympic and Sports Committee (COSR) sent the nation's smallest team to the Games since the 1988 Summer Olympics in Seoul. A total of 108 athletes, 50 men and 58 women, had competed in 16 different sports, most notably in artistic gymnastics and rowing. For the third time in Olympic history, Romania was again represented by more female than male athletes.

The Romanian team featured several Olympic medalists from Sydney four years earlier, including coxless rowing pair Monica Roşu and Viorica Susanu, sprint canoeists Florin Popescu and Mitică Pricop, gymnastics champion Marius Urzică in men's pommel horse, and rowers Doina Ignat and Georgeta Andrunache. Pistol shooter and 1988 Olympic champion Sorin Babii, and rowing legend Elisabeta Lipă, who won a total of seven Olympic medals in her illustrious sporting career, became the first Romanian athletes to compete in six Olympic Games. Having received the second most medals by a single athlete in the nation's Olympic history, Lipa reprised her role to carry the Romanian flag in the opening ceremony for the second consecutive time.

Despite being the smallest team to the Games since 1988, Romania left Athens with a total of 19 Olympic medals, 8 golds, 5 silver, and 6 bronze, failing only three golds short of the total achieved in Sydney. Most of these medals were awarded to the athletes in artistic gymnastics and rowing, including three prestigious Olympic titles from Cătălina Ponor in women's floor, balance beam, and team all-around exercises. Apart from Ponor's Olympic glory, the nation's highlight of the Games also came with a powerful triumph of the rowing team, as the Romanians managed to secure their title in the women's eight. With a stark tally of eight medals, Lipa greatly emerged as the most successful female rower in the entire Olympic history after winning her fourth consecutive gold and fifth overall within a record span of 20 years.

Medalists

|  style="text-align:left; width:72%; vertical-align:top;"|

| style="text-align:left; width:23%; vertical-align:top;"|

Athletics

Romanian athletes have so far achieved qualifying standards in the following athletics events (up to a maximum of 3 athletes in each event at the 'A' Standard, and 1 at the 'B' Standard).

 Key
 Note – Ranks given for track events are within the athlete's heat only
 Q = Qualified for the next round
 q = Qualified for the next round as a fastest loser or, in field events, by position without achieving the qualifying target
 NR = National record
 N/A = Round not applicable for the event
 Bye = Athlete not required to compete in round

Men
Field events

Women
Track & road events

Field events

Boxing

Romania sent three boxers to Athens.  None lost in the round of 32, as two won and the third had a bye.  In the round of 16, though, one boxer was defeated.  Another fell in the quarterfinal. The third survived to the semifinal, where he was defeated to finish with a bronze medal.  That medal put Romania in a five-way tie for 16th place in the boxing medal count.

Canoeing

Sprint
Men

Women

Qualification Legend: Q = Qualify to final; q = Qualify to semifinal

Cycling

Mountain biking

Diving

Women

Equestrian

Eventing

Fencing

Six Romanian fencers (two men and four women) qualified for the following events.

Men

Women

Gymnastics

Artistic
Men
Team

Individual finals

Women
Team

* Oana Ban qualified for the individual all-around, but later withdrew from the final because of her injuries sustained in the team all-around final.

Individual finals

Judo

Four Romanian judoka (two men and two women) qualified for the 2004 Summer Olympics.

Men

Women

Rowing

Romanian rowers qualified the following boats:

Men

Women

Qualification Legend: FA=Final A (medal); FB=Final B (non-medal); FC=Final C (non-medal); FD=Final D (non-medal); FE=Final E (non-medal); FF=Final F (non-medal); SA/B=Semifinals A/B; SC/D=Semifinals C/D; SE/F=Semifinals E/F; R=Repechage

Shooting

Two Romanian shooters qualified to compete in the following events:

Men

Swimming

Romanian swimmers earned qualifying standards in the following events (up to a maximum of 2 swimmers in each event at the A-standard time, and 1 at the B-standard time):

Men

Women

Table tennis

Four Romanian table tennis players qualified for the following events.

Tennis

Romania nominated two male tennis players to compete in the tournament.

Weightlifting

Seven Romanian weightlifters qualified for the following events:

Men

Women

Wrestling

 Key
  – Victory by Fall.
  – Decision by Points – the loser with technical points.
  – Decision by Points – the loser without technical points.

Men's freestyle

Men's Greco-Roman

See also
 Romania at the 2004 Summer Paralympics

References

External links
Official Report of the XXVIII Olympiad
Romanian Olympic and Sports Committee 

Nations at the 2004 Summer Olympics
2004
Summer Olympics